Mirzəhüseynli (also, Mirzaguseynli and Mirza-Useynly) is a village and municipality in the Goychay Rayon of Azerbaijan.  It has a population of 756.

References 

Populated places in Goychay District